The 2014–15 VfB Stuttgart season was the 122nd season in the club's history. In the previous season, Stuttgart finished just five points ahead of the relegation zone.

First team squad
The club's current squad:

Players out on loan

Transfers

In

Out

Competitions

Bundesliga

League table

Results summary

Results by round

Matches

DFB-Pokal

References

Stuttgart
VfB Stuttgart seasons